ReAct Now: Music & Relief was a four-and-a-half-hour-long benefit concert which aired on September 10, 2005. MTV, VH1, CMT, MTV2, MTVU, VH1 Classic and The N broadcast the concert, which raised about $30 million for Hurricane Katrina relief efforts via the American Red Cross, the Salvation Army, and America's Second Harvest (which has been changed to Feeding America in 2008).

Performers and setlists in order  

Alicia Keys - "You'll Never Walk Alone" (New York City)
Kid Rock & Lynyrd Skynyrd - "Sweet Home Alabama" (Nashville)
Kelly Clarkson - "Shelter" (Los Angeles)
Jon Stewart in New York City
Green Day - "Wake Me Up When September Ends" (Foxborough)
The Rolling Stones - "Waiting on a Friend" (Milwaukee)
John Mayer Trio - "Gravity" (Los Angeles)
David Banner - "Cadillacs on 22" (New York City)
Rob Thomas - "Time After Time" (New York City)
Buckwheat Zydeco - "I'm Gonna Love You Anyway" (Nashville)
Coldplay - "Fix You" (New York City)
Big & Rich - "I Pray For You" (Chicago)
Nine Inch Nails - "Non-Entity", "Hurt" (Los Angeles)
Jon Stewart in New York City
Sheryl Crow - "Good Is Good" (New York City)
Bon Jovi - "Someday I'll Be Saturday Night" (Chicago)
George Lopez in Los Angeles
U2 - "Love and Peace or Else" (Toronto)
Common - "It's Your World" (Los Angeles)
Beck - "Everybody's Got to Learn Sometime" (Los Angeles)
The Neville Brothers - "Brother" (Nashville)
Dashboard Confessional - "Ghost of a Good Thing" (New York City)
Pearl Jam - "Given to Fly" (Saskatoon)
Jewel - "Life Uncommon" (Los Angeles)
3 Doors Down - "Here by Me" (Charleston)
Neil Young & Emmylou Harris - "This Old Guitar" (Nashville)
Kanye West - "Touch the Sky" (Los Angeles)
Kurt Loder in New York City
Elton John - "Porch Swing in Tupelo" (Toronto)
John Corbett in Nashville
Marc Broussard - "Home" (Nashville)
Melissa Etheridge - "Four Days" (Los Angeles)
Mötley Crüe & Chester Bennington - "Home Sweet Home" (Nashville)
Dennis Quaid in Los Angeles
Brian Wilson - "Walking Down the Path of Life" / "Love and Mercy" (Los Angeles)
Alan Jackson - "Rainy Day in June" (New York City)
Maroon 5 - "Don't Let Me Down" (Los Angeles)
Staind - "Right Here" (Charleston)
David Banner in New York City
Goo Goo Dolls - "Give a Little Bit" (Los Angeles)
John Mellencamp - "Walk Tall" (Morrison, Colorado)
Sugarland - "Stand Back Up" (Nashville)
Chris Rock in New York City
Red Hot Chili Peppers - "Under the Bridge" (Los Angeles)
The Game - "Dreams" (Los Angeles)
Paul McCartney - "Fine Line" (Miami)
Chris Thomas King - "What Would Jesus Do" (Nashville)
Dave Matthews Band - "American Baby" (Bonner Springs, Kansas)
Hank Williams Jr - "Backwater Blues" (Nashville)
Good Charlotte - "We Believe" (Los Angeles)
Audioslave - "Doesn't Remind Me" (Los Angeles)
Dead by Sunrise - "Let Down" (Nashville)
Fiona Apple - "Extraordinary Machine" (Los Angeles)
Alan Toussaint - "With You in Mind" (New York City)
The Radiators - "Last Getaway" (Los Angeles)
Dennis Quaid in Los Angeles
Neil Young and the Fisk Jubilee Singers - "Walking to New Orleans" (Nashville)

References

External links 
 
 

Hurricane Katrina disaster relief benefit concerts